Osmaston may refer to:

 Osmaston, Derby, England, a suburb of Derby
Osmaston Hall
 Osmaston, Derbyshire Dales, England, a village
 Osmaston, Tasmania, a rural locality in Australia
 Bertram Beresford Osmaston (1867–1961), an officer in the Imperial Forestry Service in India